Aleksy Antkiewicz (12 November 1923 – 3 April 2005) was a Polish boxer. He won two Olympic medals for Poland: bronze in London 1948 in featherweight division (which was the only Polish medal at those Olympic Games and the first medal for Poland in boxing) and silver at the next Olympics in Helsinki 1952 in the lightweight division.

He was born in Katlewo, Warmia and died in Gdańsk.

1952 Olympic results

Aleksy Antkiewicz competed as a lightweight boxer for Poland in the 1952 Olympic boxing tournament in Helsinki, Finland.  Below are his results from that tournament:

 Round of 32: defeated Benjamin Enriquez of the Philippines by decision, 3-0;
 Round of 16: defeated Hans-Werner Wohlers of West Germany by decision, 3-0;
 Quarterfinal: defeated Frederick Reardon of Great Britain by decision, 3-0;
 Semifinal: defeated Gheorge Fiat of Romania by walkover;
 Final:  lost to Aureliano Bolognesi of Italy by decision, 2-1.

References

External links
Olympic profile

1923 births
2005 deaths
Lightweight boxers
Featherweight boxers
Boxers at the 1948 Summer Olympics
Boxers at the 1952 Summer Olympics
Olympic boxers of Poland
Olympic silver medalists for Poland
Olympic bronze medalists for Poland
Olympic medalists in boxing
Medalists at the 1948 Summer Olympics
Medalists at the 1952 Summer Olympics
People from Nowe Miasto County
Sportspeople from Warmian-Masurian Voivodeship
Polish male boxers